Hîrtop is a commune in Cimișlia District, Moldova. It is composed of three villages: Hîrtop, Ialpug and Prisaca.

References

Communes of Cimișlia District